Wriothesley Baptist Noel, 2nd Earl of Gainsborough (c. 1661 – 21 September 1690) was an English peer and Member of Parliament, styled Viscount Campden from 1683 to 1689.

Early life
Wriothesley Noel was born circa 1661. He was the son of Edward Noel, 1st Earl of Gainsborough.

Career
Noel inherited the Earldom of Gainsborough in 1689. He was the MP for Hampshire 1685–1689. He was the Lord Lieutenant of Hampshire and Lord Lieutenant of Rutland.

Personal life, death and legacy
Noel married Catherine Greville, daughter of Fulke Greville, 5th Baron Brooke of Beauchamps Court and Sarah Dashwood.  He had no male heirs. His daughter Elizabeth married Henry Bentinck, who was created the 1st Duke of Portland in 1716. Noel died on 21 September 1690. He was succeeded by his cousin, Baptist Noel, 3rd Earl of Gainsborough, son of Hon. Baptist Noel and Susannah Fanshawe, daughter of Sir Thomas Fanshawe.

References

1660s births
1690 deaths
Earls of Gainsborough (1682 creation)
Lord-Lieutenants of Hampshire
Lord-Lieutenants of Rutland
Noel, Wriothesley
Wriothesley